This is a list of uniforms and clothing associated with World War II.

Helmets and hats

Allied
Adrian helmet
Beret
Balmoral bonnet
Brodie helmet
Campaign hat
Cap comforter
Caubeen
Fez
Field Service Cap
Garrison cap
General Service Cap
Glengarry
Hełm wz. 31
Helmet Steel Airborne Troop
Jeep cap
Kepi
M1 helmet
M1C helmet
M2 helmet
M38 Tanker helmet
Mk III helmet
Papakhi
Patrol cap
Peaked cap
Pith helmet
RAC helmet
Rogatywka
Sailor cap
Slouch hat
Soviet helmets during World War II
Stahlhelm (Used by the National Revolutionary Army)
Tam o' Shanter
Tent cap
Turban
Type B Helmet
Ushanka
Utility cover

Axis
Beret
Bulgarian M36 Helmet
Fez
Hachimaki
Kepi
M33 helmet
M43 field cap
Pith helmet
Sailor cap
Stahlhelm
Tally
Turban

Uniform clothing
Battle Dress
Breeches
Denison smock
Eisenhower jacket
Epaulette
Gaiters
Gorget
Greatcoat
Gymnasterka
Jumpsuit
Kilt
Knochensack
Leggings
M-1941 Field Jacket
M42 jacket
Poncho
Puttee
Sam Browne belt
Senninbari
Shirt
Shoulder strap
Smock
Telnyashka
Telogreika
Trench coat
Trews
Trousers
U.S. Army M-1943 Uniform

Footwear

chappal

Uniform equipment
1897 Pattern British Infantry Officer's Sword
1908 Pattern Webbing
1937 Pattern Web Equipment
Bandolier
Bayonet
Coast Guard Officers' Sword
Degen
Dirk
Entrenching tool
Gas mask
Haversack
Kukri
Mameluke sword
Marine non-commissioned officers' sword, 1859-present
Szabla

Patches, badges, and insignia
Army ranks of the Japanese Empire during World War II
Naval ranks of the Japanese Empire during World War II
United States Army enlisted rank insignia of World War II military police arm bands

See also
Comparative military ranks of World War II
List of equipment used in World War II

Imperial Japanese Army Uniforms
United States Army Uniform in World War II
 Ranks and insignia of the Red Army and Navy 1940–1943
 Ranks and insignia of the Soviet Armed Forces 1943–1955

Uniforms and insignia of Nazi Germany
Uniforms of the German Army (1935–1945)
Ranks and insignia of the German Army (1935–1945)
Uniforms of the Luftwaffe (1935–1945)
Ranks and insignia of the Luftwaffe (1935–1945)
 Uniforms and insignia of the Kriegsmarine
Awards and decorations of the Kriegsmarine
Nazi party paramilitary ranks
Ranks and insignia of the Nazi Party
Ranks and insignia of the Sturmabteilung
Uniforms and insignia of the Schutzstaffel
Ranks and insignia of the Ordnungspolizei
 Comparative ranks of Nazi Germany
 Orders, decorations, and medals of Nazi Germany

Military uniforms
Uniforms and clothing
Uniforms and clothing
Clothing-related lists
uniforms